The Botswana Housing Corporation Staff Union (BHCSU) is a trade union affiliate of the Botswana Federation of Trade Unions in Botswana.

References

Botswana Federation of Trade Unions
Organisations based in Gaborone
Trade unions in Botswana